The 43rd Army Corps was an Army corps in the Imperial Russian Army.

Part of
6th Army: 1915
12th Army: 1915 - 1916
12th Army: 1917

References 
 

Corps of the Russian Empire
Military units and formations of Russia in World War I